Nikita Gubenko (born 1994) is a Russian slalom canoeist who has competed at the international level since 2011.

He won a silver medal in the Extreme K1 event at the 2019 Extreme Canoe Slalom World Championships in Prague.

World Cup individual podiums

1 World Championship counting for World Cup points

References

Living people
Russian male canoeists
1994 births
Medalists at the ICF Canoe Slalom World Championships